The Agencia Carabobeña de Noticias (ACN; Carabobo's News Agency) is a Venezuelan news agency, founded on September 17, 2009 by the journalist Daniel Rios Mendoza. The center of the agency is Valencia, capital of the Carabobo State of Venezuela.

External links 
 ACN web

News agencies based in Venezuela
Publications established in 2009
Spanish-language newspapers
Mass media in Valencia, Venezuela
2009 establishments in Venezuela